Mizuochi is a Japanese surname. Notable people with the surname include:

, Japanese weightlifter
, Japanese politician

See also
Mizuochi Station, a railway station in Sabae, Fukui Prefecture, Japan

Japanese-language surnames